Estadio Román Valero is a stadium located in Madrid, Spain, that is primarily used for association football. The stadium was built in 1945 and has a capacity of 5,000. CD Colonia Moscardó is one of its tenants. Concerts have also been held at the stadium, including performances by Iron Maiden, Meat Loaf, Judas Priest, Dire Straits, Black Sabbath, Def Leppard, The Police and Whitesnake.

The stadium is located in the Usera district in the south of the city (specifically the Moscardó neighbourhood) and is within two blocks of Usera metro station.

Football venues in Madrid
Buildings and structures in Usera District, Madrid